Epping Forest is a woodland in Greater London and Essex in England. 

Epping Forest may also refer to:

Places
Australia
 Epping Forest National Park in Queensland
 Epping Forest, Kearns, a heritage-listed property in the south-western Sydney suburb of Campbelltown, New South Wales
 Epping Forest, Tasmania, a town in Tasmania

England
 Epping Forest District, a local government district in Essex that includes part of Epping Forest
 Epping Forest (UK Parliament constituency), a Parliamentary constituency for the British House of Commons
 Epping Forest College, a further education college in Loughton

United States
 Epping Forest (Jacksonville), Florida, the former estate of Alfred I. du Pont
 Epping Forest, a private, residential community near Annapolis, Maryland
 Epping Forest, an estate in Lancaster County, Virginia

Other
 USS Epping Forest (LSD-4), a US Navy ship
 "The Battle of Epping Forest", a song by Genesis